Nabila Ebeid (born 21 January 1945 in Cairo, Egypt), also spelled Nabila Ebeed, is an Egyptian actress.

Early life
Born in the district of Shoubra, Nabila was a huge fan of classical Egyptian movies and used to gather money as a kid to go to Shoubra Cinema Palace.

Career
She was first introduced to Egyptian Cinema by the Egyptian film director Atef Salem in a movie called Mafish Faida. In 1965, she starred with Omar Sharif in The Mamluks, a role which was described as her "first steps to fame".

In 1967, she co-starred with Salah Zulfikar in the highly successful political play Rubabikia, one of her few roles on stage. She has also starred in the television dramas El-Ammah Nour (Aunt Nour) and El-Bawaba El-Taniya (The Second Gate).

Personal life
She married the film director, Atef Salem, who discovered her from 1963 to 1967. Ebeid later had several secretive marriages including Osama El-Baz which lasted for nine years.

Filmography (partial)

Films
 Al-Mamalik (The Mamluks)
 Zawja Min Paris (A Wife from Paris)
Thalath Losoos (Three Thieves)
Zekra Lailat Hubb (Memory of a Night of Love)
Al-Karawan Loh Shafayef (Truth has a Voice)
El Rakesa we El Tabal (The Dancer and the Drummer)
 Al Rakesa wa al Syasi (The Dancer and the Politician)
 Abnaa' wa Katala (Sons and Killers)
 Eghteyal Modarresa (Assassination of a Teacher)
 Kahwat El Mawardi (El-Mawardi Cafe)
 Samara El-Amir 
 Tout Tout
 El Circ (The Circus)
 Rabea el Adawaya
 Kashef el Mastour (Revealing the Hidden)
 El Azraa' we el Shaar el Abyad (The Virgin and the Old Guy)
 El Akhar (The Other)
 Hoda and His excellency the Minister (original 1995, reprinted 2005)

Theater 
 Rubabikia (Robabekya)

Television 
 El-Ammah Nour (Aunt Nour)
 El-Bawaba El-Taniya (The Second Gate)

References

External links
 
 Nabila Ebeid at Complete Index To World Film

1945 births
Living people
Actresses from Cairo
Egyptian film actresses
Egyptian television actresses